As a nickname, Ox or The Ox may refer to:

People nicknamed Ox 
 Jacobus Os du Randt (born 1972), South African rugby union player nicknamed his Afrikaans nickname, which means Ox,
 Oscar Ox Eckhardt (1901–1951), American Major League Baseball and National Football League player
 Grover Ox Emerson (1907–1998), American National Football League player
 Okey Geffin (1921–2004),  South African rugby union player nicknamed "Ox" while a World War II prisoner of war
 Fred Ox McKibbon, 1920s college football player
 John Ox Miller (1915–2007), American Major League Baseball pitcher
 Retshegofaditswe Ox Nché  (born 1995), South African rugby union player nicknamed "Ox"
 Owen Ox Parry (1914–1976), American National Football League player
 James van Hoften (born 1944), American astronaut, US Navy officer and aviator and engineer

People nicknamed The Ox 
 Ox Baker (1934-2014), ring names of American professional wrestler and actor Douglas Baker
 John Entwistle (1944–2002), English musician, bassist of the band The Who
 Alex Oxlade-Chamberlain (born 1993), English footballer
 Tomasso Petto (1879–1905), New York mobster and hitman
 Charles Reiser (1878–1921), American safecracker and murderer
 David Schwarz (footballer) (born 1972), retired Australian rules footballer and radio personality
 Öküz Mehmed Pasha (Mehmed Pasha the Ox) (died 1619), Ottoman statesman, Grand Vizier and military commander

See also 

Lists of people by nickname